Pseudomonas virus gh1 (Bacteriophage gh-1) is a bacteriophage capable of infecting susceptible strains of Pseudomonas putida. It is a member of family Podoviridae, subfamily Autographivirinae. It was first isolated in 1966 from a sample taken from the aeration tank at a sewage plant in East Lansing, Michigan.

Sedimentation analysis indicates that gh-1 carries its genetic payload in the form of a 37,359 bp linear strand of dsDNA, inside an icosahedronal capsid 50 nm in diameter.

One-step growth experiments indicate that the latent period is approximately 21 min, with a burst size of 103.

It has been shown that this phage group requires an intact O-antigen on its host's outer membrane in order to successfully replicate and it is thus likely that lipopolysaccharide acts as the phage receptor.

References

External links 
  - ATCC database entry for gh-1
  - Virus-Host Database

Autographivirinae
Bacteriophages